Harthaus station is a railway station in the municipality of Germering, located in the Fürstenfeldbruck district in Upper Bavaria, Germany.

References

External links

Munich S-Bahn stations
Railway stations in Bavaria
Buildings and structures in Fürstenfeldbruck (district)
Railway stations in Germany opened in 1947